The View from Nowhere is a book by philosopher Thomas Nagel. Published by Oxford University Press in 1986, it contrasts passive and active points of view in how humanity interacts with the world, relying either on a subjective perspective that reflects a point of view or an objective perspective that takes a more detached perspective.  Nagel describes the objective perspective as the "view from nowhere", one where the only valuable ideas are ones derived independently.

Reception

Historian Peter Gay praised The View from Nowhere. Philosopher Thomas Metzinger praised and criticized the book's central concept as "beautiful" but untenable.

References

1986 non-fiction books
Oxford University Press books
Philosophy books
Works by Thomas Nagel